Kishoreganj-4 is a constituency represented in the Jatiya Sangsad (National Parliament) of Bangladesh since 2013 by Rejwan Ahmed Toufiq of the Awami League.

Boundaries 
The constituency encompasses Austagram, Itna, and Mithamain upazilas.

History 
The constituency was created in 1984 from a Mymensingh constituency when the former Mymensingh District was split into four districts: Mymensingh, Sherpur, Netrokona, and Kishoreganj.

Members of Parliament

Elections

Elections in the 2010s 
Rejwan Ahmed Toufiq was re-elected unopposed in the 2014 general election after opposition parties withdrew their candidacies in a boycott of the election.

In April 2013, Abdul Hamid became President of Bangladesh, vacating his parliamentary seat. Rejwan Ahmed Toufiq, his son, stood as an Awami League candidate in the resulting July 2013 by-election, and was elected.

Elections in the 2000s

Elections in the 1990s

References

External links
 

Parliamentary constituencies in Bangladesh
Kishoreganj District